The 2001–02 Hong Kong First Division League season was the 91st since its establishment.

Teams
 Buler Rangers (Originally Rangers, branded due to sponsorship from Buler Watch)
 Double Flower (Renamed from Instant-Dict after the end of sponsorship)
 Happy Valley (Defending Champion)
 HKFC (Promoted from Second Division)
 South China
 Sun Hei
 Xiangxue Pharmaceutical (Team admitted from China)

League table

References
 www.rsssf.com Hongkong 2001/02

Hong Kong First Division League seasons
Hong Kong First Division League, 2001-02
First Division